Star Trek: The Correspondence Game is a play-by-mail game that was published by Entertainment Concepts, Inc.

Gameplay
Star Trek: The Correspondence Game was a science-fiction PBM that presented players with the opportunity to captain their own starship - either the Enterprise or another comparable Federation heavy cruiser.

Reception
In the April 1983 edition of Dragon (Issue 72), Michael Gray stated "Just like Silverdawn, this ECI game allows you to write up to three pages of orders each turn for your ship and crew. This game could turn out to be as good as Silverdawn; it will all depend on the time and creativity of the gamemaster."

W.G. Armintrout reviewed Star Trek: The Correspondence Game in Space Gamer No. 66. Armintrout commented that "the gamemastering problems in Star Trek mar an otherwise excellent game. I felt boxed in at times, and at other times wondered if my orders really counted. It was still fun, but less of a real game."

A reviewer in the November–December 1983 issue of PBM Universal portrayed the game as a space version of Silverdawn, highlighting its readable rulebook and the crew's "immense detail".

See also
 List of play-by-mail games

References

Games based on Star Trek
Play-by-mail games